Yael Segal (born 21 July 1972) is a former Israeli professional tennis player.

Playing for Israel Fed Cup team, she has a win–loss record of 11–15.

ITF Circuit finals

Singles (8–2)

Doubles (2–8)

References

External links
 
 

1972 births
Living people
Jewish tennis players
Israeli female tennis players
Israeli Jews